Henrietta Greville MBE, (9 October 1861 – 29 August 1964) was an Australian labour organiser and one of the first women to run for the Australian Parliament with major party endorsement.

Biography 
Greville was born in Dunedin, New Zealand, to Australian-born gold prospector Henry Wyse and his wife, Rebecca ( Hutchinson) Wyse. The family moved to Victoria in 1866 and to New South Wales in 1868. Despite her lack of formal education Henrietta was briefly a teacher at the age of 17. On 3 August 1881 at Albury Registry Office she married jeweller John Collins, but the marriage was unhappy and they separated in 1889, Henrietta and her four children returning to her parents' farm at Temora. (Collins later died in Western Australia.)

Greville worked as a seamstress, but the 1890s depression forced her to move to the goldfields at West Wyalong, where she helped to establish a local branch of the Political Labour League. She married miner and union organiser Hector Greville on 30 August 1894, and despite constantly moving to support the family they had a happy marriage. Henrietta became an organiser for the Australian Workers' Union and later became influential in the Women Workers' Union, serving as its delegate to the Trades and Labour Council. In 1902 the family was in Sydney, where Greville became associated with Bertha McNamara's radical group, and in 1908 she became an organiser for the White Workers' Union. An anti-conscription campaigner, she and Eva Seery were the first women endorsed for a federal election by a major political party when they ran for the 1917 federal election as Labor candidates, albeit in safe conservative seats (Greville was defeated in Wentworth). She subsequently stood for the state seat of Vaucluse in 1927.

Greville studied economics from 1914 to 1916 and became branch secretary of the Workers' Educational Association of New South Wales at Lithgow in 1918, moving to the executive in 1919 and president (the first female president) in 1920. She remained active for many years, being particularly associated with sex education, and was directing groups aged 94. Her husband died in 1938, but Greville remained a public figure, and in 1945 was made a life member of the Union of Australian Women. Around this time she began to identify more with the Communist Party of Australia, which she supported but did not join.

She was appointed a Member of the Order of the British Empire in January 1958. She died aged 103 at Lakemba in 1964 and was cremated. A block of pensioners' units was named in her memory in that year. She was survived by two sons and a daughter of her second marriage.

References

1861 births
1964 deaths
Australian centenarians
Australian feminists
Australian Members of the Order of the British Empire
New Zealand people of Australian descent
Australian suffragists
Women centenarians
19th-century Australian women
20th-century Australian women politicians